Ganiyu is a Nigerian name that may refer to

Ganiyu
Gani Adams (Ganiyu Adams, born 1970), Nigerian social activist and politician
Ganiyu Akanbi Bello (1930–2014), Nigerian community leader and business tycoon
Ganiyu Dawodu (1933–2006), Nigerian politician and democracy activist
Ganiyu Oseni (born 1991), Nigerian football striker
Ganiyu Solomon (born 1959), Nigerian politician
Muideen Ganiyu (born 1979), Nigerian boxer

See also
Abdul Ganiyu